The Tafelgüterverzeichnis is a list of  the "courts which belong to the table of the king of the Romans" (curie que pertinent ad mensam regis Romanorum), that is, a register of the lands belonging to the royal demesne (or fisc) and of the payments in cash or in kind which each estate owed annually. The title "king of the Romans" was the preferred official title of the medieval Kings of Germany if they had not yet been crowned Holy Roman Emperor. Besides Germany, they also ruled the kingdoms of Italy and Burgundy. The Tafelgüterverzeichnis lists lands in both Germany and Italy.

Manuscript and date
The Tafelgüterverzeichnis is found, alongside ten other documents pertaining to the Kornelimünster in Aachen and dating to the last quarter of the twelfth century, in manuscript "Bonn S. 1559" in the library of the University of Bonn. It is a "draft of a letter sent by a canon of Aachen to someone of high rank in the king's entourage, perhaps his chancellor[, and] not really part of a survey policy [nor] an administrative document in the strict sense of the word." It is nevertheless the closest thing to a fiscal record of the German monarchy in the twelfth century.

The date of the Tafelgüterverzeichnis has been a matter of debate for over a century. It was probably drawn up after the first coronation of a king (as "King of the Romans") and before his imperial coronation, since the compiler is uncertain about the Italian estates: "How much they give no one can relate or find out unless we come to Lombardy." The use of the "Roman" title precludes its being earlier than the reign of Henry IV, leading to an earliest dating of 1064/5. Most commonly it is dated either to the first year (1152) of the reign of Frederick I or to the eve of his fifth visit to Italy (1173/4). It has been dated as late as 1185/9 by Wolfgang Metz, who argues that the Tafelgüterverzeichnis was compiled in three phases and only took on its final form through the work of a ministerialis, perhaps William of Aachen, under Henry VI.

Contents
The curie (singular curia) of the register were royal farmlands associated with manors, castles or towns. There were 20 recorded in Saxony, 21 in "Franconia along the Rhine" (Francia circa Rhenum, including Lotharingia), 12 in Bavaria and 28 in Lombardy. The register is divided between these four regions, but while its information on the German regions is detailed and consistent, that for Lombardy is uneven. It is not a complete list of lands owned by the crown, much of which was enfeoffed, nor even a complete list of crown lands that were directly exploited by the monarchs. No lands in Swabia or Alsace are included, possibly because these had been informally attached as an appanage to the Duchy of Swabia. This would place the date of composition of the Tafelgüterverzeichnis after the election of Conrad III of the Swabian House of Hohenstaufen in 1138. On the other hand, the total number of services (servitia) owed by the Saxon estates is greater than that owed by all the other estates combined. This is best explained by dating the register to the reign of Lothair III (1125–37), who was a Saxon and whose court was dominated by Saxons. A Saxon servitium consisted of "thirty large pigs, three cows, five suckling pigs, fifty hens, fifty eggs, ninety cheeses, ten geese, five barrels of beer, five pounds of pepper, ten pounds of wax, wine from cellars all over Saxony." The servitia in the other German regions consisted of the same products in different proportions, with the Bavarian and Franconian servitia being the same. The high burden of the servitia suggests they were for the support of an army or of the royal palace year-round, but there is no indication of the period of time which a servitium was supposed to cover.

The totals of servitia owed in Saxony and Bavaria are given by the scribe as "as many days as are in year plus 40" (quot sunt dies in anno, et XL plus) and 26, respectively. Since specific service requirements are only given for two Saxon estates, and a total of 405 were owed by the 20 estates, the average number owed by the other 18 for which now specific requirement is given must be 20 servitia, a very high number, given that only one other estate in the entire register owed more than eight. Nine of the 28 Lombard estates owed cash payments totaling 5,600 marks (marcas). None of the German estates owed any. The imperial crown—and the authority in Italy that was established with it—were appealing to the German kings largely for the monetary resources that the advance economy of Lombardy provided. The Tafelgüterverzeichnis does not mention any tolls, although these were increasingly the main means of raising cash in Germany. Sixteen of the estates in the register are known to have had royal toll stations, but these are not mentioned.

The most common meat in the Tafelgüterverzeichnis is pork, although archaeological evidence suggests that beef was more common.

Other theories
Caroline Göldel argues that the Tafelgüterverzeichnis is not a list of renders owed to the king and his entourage, but was drawn up in 1165 by Otto of Andechs, then provost of the Kornelimünster, in connexion with the canonisation of Charlemagne. She believes Frederick I was made a canon of Aachen at that time, and that the register records the benefices associated with this honorary canonry.

John Freed states that it was compiled in 1173 or 1174 to protect the interests of the diocese of Bamberg.

Table
This table is derived from Ludwig Weiland's critical edition of 1893.

 —
 —
 —

Notes

Sources

Further reading

Medieval documents of Germany
12th century in the Holy Roman Empire
12th-century manuscripts